The 1997 U.S. Women's Open was the 52nd U.S. Women's Open, held July 10–13 at the Witch Hollow course of Pumpkin Ridge Golf Club near North Plains, Oregon, northwest of Portland.

Alison Nicholas entered the final round with a three stroke lead and shot an even-par 71 to win her only major title, one stroke ahead of runner-up Nancy Lopez. In the final pairing, Lopez slid a  downhill birdie putt past the 72nd hole while Nicholas sank a three-footer (0.9 m) for par to win at 274 (−10). Lopez, age 40 and in search of the title that eluded her, was the first-ever player to shoot four rounds in the 60s in the U.S. Women's Open.

Two-time defending champion Annika Sörenstam's attempt for an unprecedented third straight title came up short. Five-over-par after her first nine holes on Thursday, she carded 77-73 for 150 (+8) and missed the 36-hole cut by three strokes, fourteen strokes behind the lead. Through 2021, no one has won three consecutive U.S. Women's Opens.

The final round attendance on Sunday was a record 31,700 and the seven-day total was 123,850.

This was the first U.S. Women's Open at Pumpkin Ridge; the championship returned just six years later in 2003. It previously hosted the U.S. Amateur in 1996, the third straight victory by 20-year-old Tiger Woods in his final competition as an amateur.

Past champions in the field

Made the cut

Source:

Missed the cut

Source:

Round summaries

First round
Thursday, July 10, 1997

Source:

Second round
Friday, July 11, 1997

Source:

Third round
Saturday, July 12, 1997

Source:

Final round
Sunday, July 13, 1997

Source:

References

External links
U.S. Women's Open - past champions - 1997

U.S. Women's Open
Golf in Oregon
Sports competitions in Oregon
U.S. Women's Open
U.S. Women's Open
U.S. Women's Open
U.S. Women's Open
Women's sports in Oregon